Cuchavira or Cuchaviva is the rainbow deity, protector of working women and the sick in the religion of the Muisca. The Muisca and their confederation were one of the advanced civilizations of the Americas and in the fertile intermontane valley that forms the Altiplano Cundiboyacense in the Andes rain and sun were both very important for their agriculture. Moreover, in those days the Bogotá savanna consisted of various swamps and floodings were regular.

Description 

Cuchavira, who was called "shining air", appeared before the Muisca when Bochica, the messenger of the supreme being Chiminigagua was sent to the plains of the Muisca. Also when rain god Chibchacum was angry, he sent heavy rains to the flatlands, causing the rivers to flood, destroying the agriculture and the houses (bohíos) of the Muisca. When the rains were over and the Sun was shining again, causing Cuchavira to appear, the people offered low-grade gold or gold-copper alloys (tumbaga), marine snails and small emeralds to thank him.

Gallery

See also 
Nencatacoa

References

Bibliography 
 

Muisca gods
Sky and weather gods
Muysccubun
Rainbows in culture
Health gods